During the 1937–38 English football season, Everton competed in the Football League First Division.

Final league table

Results

Football League First Division

FA Cup

Squad

References

Everton F.C. seasons
Everton